Sam Michel is an American author. He is married to the writer Noy Holland. They live in western Massachusetts with their two children.

Publications
He wrote Under the Light, a collection of stories, "Strange Cowboy, Lincoln Dahl Turns Five"' (Tyrant Books 2012) and Big Dogs and Flyboys, published by Southern Methodist University Press in 2007.

His fiction has appeared in The Massachusetts Review, The New York Tyrant, Epoch and elsewhere.

Academic
Michel studied writing under Gordon Lish. He received a MFA degree from the University of Florida.

Michel was Writer-in-Residence at Phillips Academy (1994–1997) and has taught in the creative writing program at the University of Florida and at the MFA Program for Poets & Writers at the University of Massachusetts Amherst (UMass).

External links
Sam Michel in The Massachusetts Review
Big Dogs and Flyboys synopsis and blurbs

21st-century American novelists
American male novelists
University of Florida alumni
Year of birth missing (living people)
Living people
University of Massachusetts Amherst faculty
American male short story writers
21st-century American short story writers
21st-century American male writers
Novelists from Massachusetts